"The Touch of Your Lips" is a song written by Ray Noble in 1936.

The song gave its title to the following albums:
 The Touch of Your Lips (Chet Baker album), 1979
 The Touch of Your Lips (Pat Boone album), 1964
 The Touch of Your Lips (Nat King Cole album), 1961